The Oxnard Public Library is a free public library system operated by the City of Oxnard, California. It has three locations: the Downtown Main Library, the South Oxnard Branch Library, and the Colonia Branch Library.

History

Preface 
The area, now known as the Oxnard Plain, was inhabited by Chumash Indians. Juan Cabrillo, a visitor reported to the Queen of Spain in 1542, described the area as the "land of everlasting summers". Approximately 50,000 Indians were in the vicinity. Then other European immigrants began to settle and farming became a major industry. The first church was built in 1900, and the Ventura County Railway was built for transporting beets from the field. Then the Oxnard Union High School District was formed in 1902. It was not until 1906 that educator and first mayor of Oxnard, Richard B. Haydock, applied for assistance to construct a library building from the Andrew Carnegie Foundation. Oxnard, the largest city in Ventura County, is the center of the vast alluvial plain which is now known as the Oxnard Plain, at 180 square miles is the richest agricultural land in California.

General 
The Oxnard Public Library first opened in 1907. It is located on the corner of C and Fourth Streets. The library was funded by the Andrew Carnegie Foundation. Later in 1909, the library opened up deposit stations where they would maintain a few collections of books. The deposit stations eventually became library branches. The branches were maintained in Port Hueneme, Moorpark, Saticoy, Camarillo, Somis, and Santa Susana. However, those branches were dissolved in 1915 by the Ventura County Board of Supervisors(VCBS). The VCBS established the Oxnard Library branches into the Ventura County Library System. During that time, the City of Oxnard leaders wanted to keep the Oxnard Public Library as a city library. So, it stayed separate from the County Library System.

Over the years, the library went through a few building expansions. In 1956, it introduced a bookmobile service. This was the library’s first extension. In 1963, the library moved its Main Library to its second location on the corner of C and Second streets. In 1922, the library moved to its current location at 251 South A Street. The newest location provides space for additional books, audio-visual materials, meeting rooms, an amphitheater, and study rooms. In 2000, the library added public computers, a computer lab, and an automated book return system.

In 1989, the bookmobile was replaced by the opening of the South Oxnard Center Branch Library. In 2007, the branch also went through a renovation and was relapsed by a state-of-the-art 23,000 square-foot building. The new and improved South Oxnard Branch Library provides additional services that include a homework center, study rooms, Children's, Teens', and Spanish-language sections, public computers, a computer lab, and a self-check-in and check-out system.

In 1978, the Colonia Branch Library opened. This library also provides services such as public computers, class visits, and special programs for all ages.

Mission 
Those local history collections are an accumulation of materials that provide information concerning Oxnard and Ventura County history. Materials include photographs, books, periodicals, and files of pertinent information. Its mission is to enrich the lives of the community by providing free and access to the resources, services, and programs that encourage learning and future success. They have abbreviated the mission as OPL. 

 Offer open access to all library resources 
 Provide quality customer service 
 Lead way to life-long learning

Local History Collection 
The Oxnard Public Library is committed to preserving the local history and culture of Oxnard. The Local History Collection is placed in the Special Collection Room in the Main Library. The materials available in this collection are information collected from Oxnard and Ventura County history. There are books, photographs, periodicals, and other files in this collection. The collection is available for public access. All related material can be accessed with appointments that can be made with a reference librarian.

One of the collected materials is books that are valuable to the history of Oxnard City and Ventura County. The Special Collection Room has various school yearbooks that are mostly from Oxnard High School. For many years, these books were donated to the collection. The yearbooks have become quite popular in the library so they started buying the Oxnard High School yearbooks each year. There are a few gaps in the yearbook collection as it was mostly donated. The library is actively looking for those missing books. They have the first yearbook from 1906 to the present. There are also various personal memoirs of Ventura County residents including a scrapbook of notes and photographs of a French immigrant family. Along with personal testimonies, there are biographical dictionaries of prominent citizens in the area during the 20th century. The history of the first farmers in that area along with individual biographies of people like banker Achille Levy and Senator Thomas Bard are all available. Furthermore, there are books that detail the raising and processing of sugar beets because the American Beet Sugar Company refinery was built in 1898 in Oxnard. The refinery helped develop the town, Oxnard. Additionally, the collection also hosts telephone and street directories since 1908. These can be used for genealogical research or identifying a particular business that is not open anymore.

The Oxnard Public Library subscribes to The Ventura County Historical Society Quarterly. This means that the quarterly is available on the library's online catalog. The quarterly can also be viewed in the Special Collection Room in the Main Library. A photocopy machine is provided in the room if you want a copy of any article. You can also request a copy by contacting your local public library and loan the said article through an interlibrary loan.

The library possesses The Oxnard Press-Courier on microfilm from January 1900 to June 1994, when it ended. From June 1994 and onwards, the library began microfilming the Ventura County Star. Some of the newspapers are available on the library’s online catalog, starting from 1900 to 1904 and 1954 to 1996. The Los Angeles Times is also on microfilm from 1972 to the present.

Shades of California program 
The Oxnard Public Library is one of nine libraries in the state of California to have participated in a photo history project known as the "Shades of California" program. In 1998, Library guests and members of the surrounding communities were invited to bring in their own personal collections of family photos and albums. Volunteers were tasked with making selections in addition to gathering contextual information regarding the selected photographs. Digital versions of the archive are made available online by the library.

Carnegie Library 
Shortly after the city of Oxnard incorporated in 1903, city leaders applied to philanthropist Andrew Carnegie for funds to build a local library. In 1906, Carnegie agreed to supply $10,000 to build the library; he later increased his donation to $12,000 after shortages in supplies and labor due to the San Francisco earthquake caused all bids for the Oxnard Library to come in significantly over budget. Local donations and city funds covered the rest of the cost of the land, building, furnishings, and books, which totaled, according to local press, $20,918.11.

Architect Franklin Pierce Burnham of Los Angeles designed the building in a Neo-Classical style featuring pedimented porticos supported by Doric columns. The building was open to the public on May 15, 1907. From 1907-1950, the building operated as a combined library and city hall, with the library on the main floor and city offices in the basement. In 1923, an extension was added on the library's east side, doubling its capacity.

From 1909 to 1915, the Oxnard Public Library supported deposit stations in neighboring communities (Port Hueneme, Moorpark, Saticoy, Camarillo, Somis, and Santa Susana). This arrangement was dissolved by the Ventura County Board of Supervisors when the county library system was established and took over responsibility for supplying library service to those communities. Oxnard opted not to join the new county library system but maintain service as a separate city library.

The original library building, vacated by the library in 1963, was added to the National Register of Historic Places in 1971 and became the Carnegie Art Museum in 1986.

Expansions 
The main downtown library was moved from the Carnegie building to a larger facility in 1963 and then again in 1992.  In the mid to late 20th century, the library expanded services throughout the city of Oxnard. First by offering bookmobile service (1956-1989) then by opening additional branch locations. The main library moved to a second location in the corner of C and second streets in 1963 with its current 72,000 square-foot located at 251 South A Street in 1992. South Oxnard Branch opened in 1989 which then moved into the new facility in 2007. Colonia Branch, a small neighborhood branch, opened in 1978. The new buildings provide additional space for books and audio-visual material, meeting rooms, study rooms, and an amphitheater. In the year 2000, the library added public computers, computer labs, and an automated book return system.

Community 
The city of Oxnard, located on the California coastline between Los Angeles and Santa Barbra, is one of the fastest-growing cities in southern California. Oxnard has a diverse population of 210,037. The Oxnard Public Library is the preservation of local history and culture. Its rich cultural history goes back to the days of the California ranchos. The city features uncrowded beaches, major commercial and industrial centers, and prime agricultural land.

Services

Oxnard Public Library 
The Oxnard Public Library is open from Mondays to Thursdays from 9 a.m. to 8 p.m. and on Saturdays from 9 a.m. to 5:30 p.m.

Also known as the Downtown Main Library, The Oxnard Public Library's Computer Lab, located on the second floor, has 22 public computers with internet access available for free with a one-hour time limit. The Homework Center has 8 computers and provides help for 1st through 12th graders.  During the school year, it is open Monday through Thursday from 3 p.m. to 7 p.m. The library also provides online tutoring programs and computer assistance.

The library hosts story-times for children. The baby/toddler story-time for 18 to 36 months old is on Wednesday mornings from 10:30 a.m. to 11 a.m. The preschool story-time for 3 to 5-year-olds is on Tuesday morning from 10:30 a.m. to 11 a.m. For more information, you can call the Children’s Reference Desk.

Because of COVID-19 many of their in-person services are on hold. Please check with the library for current updates.

Resources and databases 
The Oxnard Public Library offers to its patrons online versions of the Ventura County Star, the local newspaper publication circulating in Ventura County. Among other newspaper publications made available include ProQuest Research Companion which is made available for library Patrons.

Literacy Outreach Program 
The Oxnard Public Library also provides what is known as the Literacy Outreach Program where free one-on-one tutoring is available to adults of the community over the age of 18 who are ready and willing to meet regularly with a volunteer tutor.

South Oxnard Branch Library 
The South Oxnard Library is open from Mondays to Thursdays from 9 a.m. to 8 p.m. and on Saturdays from 9 a.m. to 5:30 p.m.

The library has a Homework Center that provides one-on-one help for K-12th graders. During the school year, it’s open Monday through Thursday from 3 p.m. to 7 p.m. The summer hours vary and you can find out when they’re open by calling them. The library also provides internet access, word processing, printing for students, slideshow software, and computer assistance. The library has 24 computers with internet access available, free of charge. Four study rooms are available on a first-come basis. There’s no advanced reservation available. Each room has a two-hour limit.

The library hosts story-times for kids. The baby/toddler story-time for infants to 3-year-olds is on Monday mornings from 11 a.m. to 11:30 a.m. The school-age storytime for K through 3rd graders is on Monday afternoons from 4 p.m. to 4:30 p.m. The Preschool story-time for 3 to 5-year-olds is on Wednesday morning from 11 a.m. to 11:30 a.m.

Colonia Branch Library 
The Colonia Branch Library is open from Monday to Thursday from 12 p.m. to 6 p.m. This branch has 6 computers with internet access for free.

Carnegie Oxnard Public Library 
The Carnegie Oxnard Public Library, now the Carnegie Art Museum, resides at 424 South C St. Oxnard, CA 93030. It was originally built and opened in 1906 under a $12,000 Carnegie grant. The building was designed by Los Angeles architect Franklin Burnham. The Carnegie building was a functioning library up until 1963. It wouldn’t be until 1978 when it was renovated and reopened in 1980 as the Carnegie Art Museum.

References

External links 
 

Public libraries in California
Buildings and structures in Oxnard, California
Education in Oxnard, California
Libraries in Ventura County, California